The 1996 Nordic Figure Skating Championships were held from February 23rd through February 25th, 1996 at the Askerhallen in Asker, Norway. The competition was open to elite figure skaters from Nordic countries. Skaters competed in two disciplines, men's singles and ladies' singles, across two levels: senior (Olympic-level) and junior.

Senior results

Men

Ladies

Junior results

Men

Ladies

References

Nordic Figure Skating Championships, 1996
Nordic Figure Skating Championships, 1996
Nordic Figure Skating Championships
International figure skating competitions hosted by Norway
Sport in Asker
Winter sports competitions in Norway